Tricula bollingi is a species of freshwater snail with a gill and an operculum, an aquatic gastropod mollusk in the family Pomatiopsidae. This species is common in Thailand.

Parasites 
Tricula bollingi is an intermediate host for Schistosoma ovuncatum.

References 

Pomatiopsidae